The Federal Correctional Institution, Phoenix (FCI Phoenix) is a medium-security United States federal prison for male inmates in Arizona. It is operated by the Federal Bureau of Prisons, a division of the United States Department of Justice. The facility also has an adjacent satellite prison camp for minimum-security female offenders.

FCI Phoenix is located approximately 25 miles north of downtown Phoenix, also west of Anthem, Arizona but still within the city limits.

History
An environmental impact study was prepared in 1980 for the proposed prison, which was being planned while the federal prison system was overwhelmed with incoming inmates. The facility was opened in April 1985 with two housing units, each containing 66 rooms at the time. By 2002, it employed 349 staff and held 1,525 inmates.

Notable events
On November 4, 2005, Earl Krugel, an activist for the Jewish Defense League, a far right pro-Israel organization, was in the exercise yard when another inmate bludgeoned him to death with a block of concrete. Krugel, who had been convicted for plotting to bomb the office of Arab-American Congressman Darrell Issa in California, had only been at the prison for three days. Inmate David Frank Jennings was subsequently identified as the attacker. In 2007, Jennings pleaded guilty to second-degree murder and was sentenced to 35 years in prison in 2008.

Notable Inmates (current and former)

See also
List of U.S. federal prisons
Federal Bureau of Prisons
Incarceration in the United States

References

External links
Official profile from the Federal Bureau of Prisons

Buildings and structures in Phoenix, Arizona
Federal Correctional Institutions in the United States
Prisons in Arizona
1985 establishments in Arizona